Sydney Ferreira Possuelo (born 19 April 1940, in Santos Dumont), is a Brazilian explorer, social activist and ethnographer who is considered the leading authority on Brazil's remaining isolated Indigenous Peoples.

Life and career

Sydney Possuelo started his career assisting the famous Villas Boas brothers with their work among indigenous peoples of the Xingu River area. Later he became the Director of the Department of Indigenous in Isolation (Departamento de Indios Isolados) at the FUNAI (National Indian Foundation of Brazil), doubling the surface size of officially designated Indigenous land in Brazil in only two years.

Working in the most isolated areas in the Amazon region, Possuelo has led many expeditions, getting in contact with isolated tribes in Brazil, with the aim to protect them from outsiders. He was responsible, among others, for the restoration of peaceful contact with the Korubo Indians, who had previously killed some FUNAI officials.

Until January 24, 2006 he was head of the FUNAI Department of Unknown Tribes, a governmental bureau responsible for protecting the land and lifestyle of isolated tribes from encroaching settlers. Days earlier, he had criticized FUNAI director Mercio Pereira Gomes for suggesting that Brazilian Indians held too much land, comparing Gomes to "ranchers, land-grabbers, miners, and loggers." Soon afterwards, Possuelo was dismissed from his position. 

Possuelo is still continuing his efforts at defending isolated tribes through the non-governmential Instituto Indigenista Interamericano.

Activism 
In a 2022 interview, Possuelo criticized then-president Jair Bolsonaro's approach to indigenous conservation, blaming his administration for an increase in illegal invasions of indigenous lands. In the interview, Possuelo stated that "Indigenous people have never faced a worst moment in Brazilian history than the one they are now facing" under Bolsonaro, who he accused of "giv[ing] cover to criminals and trespassers". In the run-up to the 2022 Brazilian general election, Possuelo stated that he had issues with aspects of Luiz Inácio Lula da Silva's past, but expected him to improve the conditions of indigenous Brazilians if elected.

Recognition 
For his many efforts Sydney has received many prizes, including honors from the National Geographic Society, Bartolomeu de las Casas in 1998, a gold medal from the Royal Geographical Society, the title of "Hero of the Planet" by Time Kids Magazine, as well as "Hero of the year" 2001 by United Nations.

Possuelo is the main protagonist in the book The Unconquered: In Search of the Amazon's Last Uncontacted Tribes (2011) by National Geographic writer Scott Wallace. It details a 76-day expedition in 2002 led by Possuelo to find the status of the "Arrow People", an uncontacted tribe in the Vale do Javari Indigenous Land.

References

External links 
National Geographic Article about Possuelo
Heroes for the Planet (Time for Kids)
BBC News: Brazilian lost tribe discovered
Video interviews of Possuelo
Brazil's Indians: Land wars - Feb 2, 2006  (The Economist)
Departamento de Indios Isolados
SYDNEY POSSUELO Sacked for speaking his mind after a lifetime defending indigenous rights
Champion for Brazil's indigenous gets fired

1940 births
Living people
Brazilian explorers
People from São Paulo
Indigenous rights activists